Jean Pierre Guisel Costa (born 6 November 1991), known as Pito, is a Brazilian futsal player who plays for FC Barcelona and the Brazilian national futsal team as a pivot and winger.

References

External links
Liga Nacional Fútbol Sala profile

1991 births
Living people
Futsal forwards
Brazilian men's futsal players
ElPozo Murcia FS players
Inter FS players
FC Barcelona Futsal players